Louis Serge Kaole (born 17 June 1990) is a Cameroonian footballer who last played as a defender for Filipino side Maharlika Manila of the Philippines Football League (PFL).

In 2020, Kaole joined PFL debutants Maharlika F.C.

Career statistics

Club

Notes

References

1990 births
Living people
Cameroonian footballers
Cameroonian expatriate footballers
Association football defenders
Stallion Laguna F.C. players
Global Makati F.C. players
Expatriate footballers in the Philippines